A hospital school is a school operated in a hospital, generally a children's hospital which provides instruction to all primary and secondary grade levels.  These schools help children regain academic progress during periods of hospitalization or rehabilitation.  The schools are most often accredited and run by the local public school system, funded by the state, and are based on the same curriculum and testing mandated by the state as is practical for the students. Enrollments are low when compared to traditional schools and teachers must provide instruction for many grade levels.

Laws and regulations on Hospital School and Domiciliary Learning change from a country to another. The studies related to this field are usually grouped under the term Home and hospital education (HHE).

List of hospital schools

References

School types